Elections were held in Dufferin County, Ontario on October 22, 2018, in conjunction with municipal elections across the province.

Dufferin County Council
Dufferin County Council has 14 members, two from each constituent municipality except for East Garafraxa and East Luther Grand Valley which elect just one member.

Amaranth

East Garafraxa

Grand Valley

Melancthon

Mono

Mulmur

Mayor

Deputy Mayor

Councillors
3 to be elected

Orangeville

Shelburne

References

Dufferin
Dufferin County